Abramovka is a rural locality (a selo) in Abramovskoye Rural Settlement, Talovsky District, Voronezh Oblast, Russia. The population was 423 as of 2010. There are five streets.

Geography 
Abramovka is located 25 km northeast of Talovaya (the district's administrative centre) by road. Uchastok №4 is the nearest rural locality.

References 

Rural localities in Talovsky District